RTL may refer to:

Media
 RTL Group, a European TV, radio, and production company
 RTL Télé Lëtzebuerg, usually referred to simply as RTL
 RTL (German TV channel)
 RTL (Hungarian TV channel), formerly known as RTL Klub
 RTL (French radio)
 RTL Nederland
 List of RTL Group's television stations (including part-owned channels)
 List of RTL Group's radio stations
 RTL 102.5, Italian radio station unaffiliated with RTL Group
 RTL9, Luxembourg television channel formerly owned by RTL Group
 RTL (Croatian TV channel), Croatian television channel formerly owned by RTL Group

Electronics
 Prefix for some Realtek integrated circuits
 Register-transfer level or register-transfer logic, of a digital logic circuit
 Register transfer language, a type of computer language
 Hewlett-Packard Raster Transfer Language, a subset of PCL
 Resistor–transistor logic, a class of digital circuits

Others
 RTL Turboliner, a gas turbine trainset
 Ride the Lightning, an album by the American heavy metal band Metallica
 Right-to-left, writing direction of a script
 Re-education through labor in the prison system of China
 , Quebec, Canada
 Runtime library, in computer software
 V/Line RTL, Road Transferable Locomotive, a class of road and rail locomotive